Sunaparant was a Konkani newspaper in Devanagari script. Based in Goa, India, it operated from 1987 to 2015. It published a special magazine during the Ganesh Chaturthi annual festival. Sunaparant was started on 13 May 1987, after Konkani was made the official language on 4 February that year, after a prolonged struggle by Goans.

History
Chandrakant Keni, who was also editing Rashtramat, was the founder editor of the four-page Konkani newspaper started from Margao, the fort of Konkani movement. He was succeeded by Uday Bhembre and Raju Nayak, after which the black-and-white newspaper was shifted to the capital city of Panaji, with 10 pages and coloured edition in 2004. In Panaji, Sandesh Prabhudesai, Anant Salkar and Babali Naik were its editors.

Nearly 28 years after its first edition, Sunaparant shut down on 1 August 2015, with the management attributing the decision to the escalating cost of bringing out the newspaper.

References 

Publications with year of establishment missing
Daily newspapers published in India
Mass media in Goa
Konkani
1987 establishments in Goa
Publications established in 1987